Maria Viktorovna Batalova (born 3 May 1996) is a Russian ice hockey player and member of the Russian national ice hockey team, currently playing in the Zhenskaya Hockey League (ZhHL) with Agidel Ufa.

Batalova participated in the women's ice hockey tournament at the 2018 Winter Olympics with the Olympic Athletes from Russia team and in the IIHF Women's World Championships in 2017, 2019, and 2021. She won gold medals with the Russian team at the Universiades in 2015, 2017, and 2019.

References

External links
 
 
 

1996 births
Living people
Sportspeople from Chuvashia
Russian women's ice hockey defencemen
Universiade medalists in ice hockey
Ice hockey players at the 2018 Winter Olympics
Olympic ice hockey players of Russia
Universiade gold medalists for Russia
Competitors at the 2015 Winter Universiade
Competitors at the 2017 Winter Universiade
Competitors at the 2019 Winter Universiade
HC Tornado players
HC Agidel Ufa players
Ice hockey players at the 2022 Winter Olympics
20th-century Russian women
21st-century Russian women